Weoley Castle is the remains of a fortified manor house located in the Birmingham district of Weoley Castle, a primarily residential area, in the English West Midlands. Owned by Birmingham City Council and administered as a community museum by Birmingham Museums Trust, it is a Grade II listed building and a Scheduled monument.
The castle was on Historic England's Heritage at Risk Register, but was removed in 2009 following repair work.

History

The archaeological evidence suggests a Norman foundation for the site which was surrounded by a moat and bank topped by a timber palisade.

Roger de Somery obtained a licence in 1264 to crenellate Weoley Castle and a 1422 survey gives a plan of the building. Early 13th century wooden buildings have been discovered at the site, probably dating to around 1264, indicating an early use of both horizontal and vertical weatherboarding. By the 17th century, Weoley Castle was noted as a '' (ruined castle) and it was no longer in use by then. Also around the same time a farmhouse was built where the education room is now. The brick wall along the right hand arm of the moat and a few apple trees are all that now remain of the farm. During the 18th century the Dudley Canal was dug along the northern boundary and the spoil was dumped in the moat. Stone from the ruin was used in the construction of canal bridges.

At some point in the 19th century, the ruins were owned by Joseph Ledsam, a local businessman and deputy chairman of the London and North Western Railway.

References

External links
 Weoley Castle Ruins Official website
 An Archaeological Overview of Weoley Castle, Birmingham
Weoley Castle – Service for schools – Educational teaching sessions and resources at Weoley Castle
Weoley Castle for Kids – fun and games for children based on Weoley Castle

Structures formerly on the Heritage at Risk register
Houses in the West Midlands (county)
Grade II listed buildings in Birmingham
Archaeological sites in the West Midlands (county)
Tourist attractions in the West Midlands (county)
Ruins in the West Midlands (county)
Castles in the West Midlands (county)
Grade II listed houses
Scheduled monuments in the West Midlands (county)
Birmingham Museums Trust